|}

The Rothesay Stakes is a Listed flat horse race in Great Britain open to  fillies and mares aged four years or older. It is run at Ayr over a distance of 1 mile and 2 furlongs (2,012 metres), and it is scheduled to take place each year in May. The race was introduced as a new Listed race in 2016.

Records

Most successful horse:
 no horse has won this race more than once

Leading jockey (2 wins):
 Andrea Atzeni – Nezwaah (2017), Shenanigans (2019)

Leading trainer (2 wins):
 Keith Dalgleish – Maleficent Queen (2016), Euro Nightmare (2018)
 Roger Varian – Nezwaah (2017), Shenanigans (2019)

Winners

See also
 Horse racing in Great Britain
 List of British flat horse races

References 

Racing Post:

Flat races in Great Britain
Ayr Racecourse
Middle distance horse races for fillies and mares
Recurring sporting events established in 2016
2016 establishments in Scotland